Celtas Cortos is a Spanish Celtic rock band. They have sold over two million records during their career, making them one of the most commercially successful Spanish groups of all time.

They formed in Valladolid (Castilla y León) in 1986. Eight friends, four of whom played in the group Almenara, decided to participate in a music contest under the name "Colectivo Eurofolk". They won the first prize and continued to play together, changing their name to Celtas Cortos. Nacho Castro, the former drummer, suggested the name based on his favourite tobacco.

They won another contest in April 1987, where the prize was the production of an album. They shared the prize with two other winners, and contributed three songs to the album Así es como suena: Folk joven.

Executive producer Paco Martín helped them get out their first album, Salida de emergencia, with only instrumental songs. The next album, Gente Impresentable added the voice and the lyrics of Jesús H. Cifuentes (Cifu) to the powerful instruments. Their celtic rock style was combined with protest and other more melancholic lyrics. Through the years their music mixed with different styles such as Caribbean music, flamenco, electronic music or reggae. Their list of hits include 20 de Abril, La senda del tiempo and Tranquilo Majete.

In 2002, Cifu left the group, a definitive turning point after the departure of César Cuenca and Nacho Martín. At the beginning of 2006, Cifu came back to the group to prepare their next release, 20 years after their foundation. Their 2008 album 40 de Abril was very popular, landing in the top five of the Spanish albums chart. Between 2008 and 2016 they released another four albums.

Discography
1988 - Así es como suena: folk joven (Demo)
1989 - Salida de emergencia
1990 - Gente impresentable
1991 - Cuéntame un cuento
1993 - Tranquilo majete
1995 - ¡Vamos!
1996 - En estos días inciertos
1997 - Nos vemos en los bares
1998 - El alquimista loco 
1999 - The best of (Compilation)
1999 - Tienes la puerta abierta
2001 - Grandes éxitos, pequeños regalos (Compilation)
2002 - Gente distinta (Compilation)
2003 - C'est la vie
2004 - Celtificado (Bootleg)
2006 - 20 soplando versos (Compilation)
2008 - 40 de Abril 
2010 - Introversiones 
2012 - Vivos y Directors 
2014 - Contratiempos
2016 - In Crescendo
2018 - Energía positiva

References

External links
 Official site (in English or Spanish)

Spanish musical groups
Celtic music groups